Petar Fajfrić (15 February 1942 – 11 March 2021) was a Serbian handball coach and player who competed for Yugoslavia in the 1972 Summer Olympics.

Club career
Over the course of his career that spanned over two decades, Fajfrić played for Mladost Zemun, Crvena zvezda, Dinamo Pančevo, Crvenka, Metaloplastika and Proleter Zrenjanin.

International career
At international level, Fajfrić competed for Yugoslavia at the 1972 Summer Olympics, winning the gold medal. He also participated in two World Championships (1970 and 1974), bringing home a bronze medal on both occasions.

Personal life
Fajfrić is the father of fellow handball players Zoran Fajfrić and Sandra Kolaković. He died from COVID-19 during the COVID-19 pandemic in Serbia, aged 79.

References

External links
 Olympic record
 

1942 births
2021 deaths
People from Berkasovo
Serbian male handball players
Yugoslav male handball players
Olympic handball players of Yugoslavia
Olympic gold medalists for Yugoslavia
Handball players at the 1972 Summer Olympics
Olympic medalists in handball
Medalists at the 1972 Summer Olympics
Competitors at the 1967 Mediterranean Games
Mediterranean Games gold medalists for Yugoslavia
Mediterranean Games medalists in handball
RK Crvena zvezda players
RK Crvenka players
RK Metaloplastika players
RK Proleter Zrenjanin players
Serbian handball coaches
Deaths from the COVID-19 pandemic in Serbia